Air Tindi is an airline based in Yellowknife, Northwest Territories, Canada. It operates scheduled and on demand charter services. Its main base is Yellowknife Airport and the airline was previously owned by the Arychuk family. The name Tindi means "the big lake" or "Great Slave Lake" in the local native Tłı̨chǫ Yatiì language.

History 

Air Tindi was established by two families, Alex Arychuk and his wife Sheila, and his brother Peter Arychuk and his wife Teri.   It began operations on 1 November 1988, with four float/ski aircraft. In 1990, it purchased its first De Havilland Canada DHC-6 Twin Otter with the help of the Rae-Edzo Development Corporation, allowing the airline to expand and provide more services to the growing mining exploration industry. In 1991, Air Tindi merged with Latham Island Airways and acquired a further four aircraft in the process. By mid-1992, Air Tindi was operating four Twin Otters on floats. In 1993, its first large aircraft was purchased, a DHC 4 Caribou for re-supply work with the mining industry. A DHC Dash 7 was acquired in 1996.

On 19 December 2006, Air Tindi was sold to Discovery Air (TSX at DA.A), a publicly traded holding company based in London, Ontario. The founders originally maintained their positions with Air Tindi, but various corporate disagreements led to Alex Arychuk leaving as president, and departing the Discovery Air board.

In August 2011 the Government of Nunavut announced that it had awarded a contract to Air Tindi and its partner Aqsaqniq, owned by Dennis Lyall, to provide medivac services to the Kitikmeot Region of Nunavut. The previous holder of the contract, Adlair Aviation, appealed to the Nunavummi Nangminiqaqtunik Ikajuuti and a decision was expected by 11 October 2011. The decision to dismiss the appeal was made 29 October 2011 and the news released 31 October. Adlair was given an extension on their contract until the end of November 2011.

Destinations 
Air Tindi operates services to the following domestic scheduled destinations (as of November 2021):
 Fort Simpson (Fort Simpson Airport)
 Gamèti (Gamètì/Rae Lakes Airport)
 Hay River (Hay River/Merlyn Carter Airport)
 Lutselk'e (Lutselk'e Airport)
 Wekweeti (Wekweètì Airport)
 Whatì (Whatì Airport)
 Yellowknife (Yellowknife Airport)

Fleet 

As of November 2021, Air Tindi had the following aircraft registered with Transport Canada and listed with Air Tindi:

The Transport Canada site lists two de Havilland Canada DHC-3 Otter DHC-3-T Turbo-Otter with  cancelled certificates.

Accidents and incidents
There were, including the pilot, four people on the aircraft and two were reported killed. The condition of the two survivors was not disclosed but they had been sent to Stanton Territorial Hospital in Yellowknife.
On 30 January 2019, A Tindi King Air 200 was en route from Yellowknife to Gamètì/Rae Lakes Airport in instrument meteorological conditions, and crashed east of the community of Whati. The two crew and sole occupants were fatally injured. The investigation determined that both attitude indicators had failed, one prior to departure and one in-flight.

References

External links

Air Tindi

Air Transport Association of Canada
Airlines established in 1988
Regional airlines of the Northwest Territories
Companies based in Yellowknife
Seaplane operators